Man on Fire is a 1980 thriller novel by the English novelist Philip Nicholson, writing as A. J. Quinnell. The plot features his popular character Creasy, an American-born former member of the French Foreign Legion, in his first appearance.

Plot
In Italy, wealthy families often hire bodyguards to protect family members from the threat of kidnapping. When Rika Balletto urges her husband Ettore, a wealthy textiles producer living in Milan, to hire a bodyguard for their daughter Pinta, he is doubtful but agrees. After some searching, he finally settles for an American named Creasy.

Creasy, once purposeful and lethal who served in the French Foreign Legion, has become a burnt-out alcoholic. To keep him occupied, his companion Guido suggests that Creasy should get a job and offers to set him up as a bodyguard: thus he is hired by the Ballettos, where he meets his charge, Pinta.

Creasy barely tolerates the precocious child and her pestering questions about him and his life. But slowly, she chips away at his seemingly impenetrable exterior, his defences drop, and he opens up to her. They become friends and he replaces her parents in their absences, giving her advice, guidance and help with her competition running: he is even spurred to give up his drinking and return to his former physical prowess. But Creasy's life is shattered when Pinta is kidnapped by the Mafia, despite his efforts to protect her.

Creasy is wounded during the kidnapping and as he lies in a hospital bed Guido keeps him informed of the goings on. Soon enough, Guido returns with the news that the exchange went bad and Pinta was found dead in a car, suffocated on her own vomit. She had also been raped by her captors.

Out of hospital, Creasy returns to Guido's pensione and outlines his plans for revenge against the men who took away the girl who convinced him it was all right to live again: anyone who was involved, or profited from it, all the way to the top of the Mafia. Told by Guido he can stay with in-laws on the island of Gozo in Malta, Creasy accepts the offer, to train for his new mission.

While on Gozo, Creasy trains for several months, getting into shape and re-familiarizing himself with weaponry. But, to his surprise, he also discovers he has another reason to live after his suicidal mission against the Mafia: he finds himself accepted by and admiring the Gozitans, as well as falling in love with Nadia, the daughter of his host.

Soon enough, he is fit and leaves for Marseille where he stocks up on supplies, weapons and ammunition: from there he travels back to Italy and then the war between Creasy and the Mafia begins. From low-level enforcers to the capos in Milan and Rome, as well as all the way to the head Don in Sicily, Creasy cuts through their organisation, killing anyone who had something even remotely to do with Pinta's kidnapping. After Creasy reveals to Rika that Ettore allowed Pinta to be kidnapped for the insurance money, Ettore commits suicide. Finally, after killing the Don, a severely wounded Creasy is taken to hospital, but pronounced dead: a funeral is held and Creasy is thought to be gone.

But, unknown to all, Creasy was in fact alive and makes it back to Gozo where he is reunited with Nadia.

Characters
 CreasyThe protagonist of the novel. Creasy originated from the US state of Tennessee. He served in the French Foreign Legion before becoming Pinta's bodyguard. A. J. Quinnell based Creasy on several people he knew from Africa and Vietnam in the 1960s and 1970s. He imagined that Creasy would look like Robert Mitchum.
 Ettore BallettoThe husband of the Balletto family and the owner of Balletto Mills, one of Italy's largest producers of knitted silk fabric. He arranged a kidnapping of Pinta to commit an insurance scam: he set up an insurance policy at Lloyd's of London for two billion lire. After Creasy confronts him and exposes him to Rika, Ettore commits suicide in his eighth floor office.
 Rika BallettoThe wife of the Balletto family.
 Pinta BallettoThe child of the Balletto family.
 Guido ArrellioCreasy's friend and the owner of the Pensione Splendide in Naples.
 MariaThe cook at the Balletto house.
 Deluca (Signora Deluca)Pinta's schoolteacher.
 Giorgio RabbiaOne of Pinta's kidnappers, he works as the driver in the kidnapping.
 Giacomo SandriOne of Pinta's kidnappers: he is Fossella's sister's son. He shoots Creasy during the kidnapping.
 Cremasco and DorigoTwo of Pinta's kidnappers. During the kidnapping, Creasy kills them before being wounded out of commission.
 Dino FossellaOne of the two main Milan-based mafia bosses of Cantarella's organisation who planned about Pinta's kidnapping. Creasy kills him by placing a bomb in his rectum and detonating it.
 AbrataOne of the two main Milan-based mafia bosses of Cantarella's organization who planned about Pinta's kidnapping.
 Joey SchembriThe younger brother of Julia, Guido's wife: Julia died in a drunk driving accident before the start of the story.
 Paul SchembriJulia, Nadia and Joey's father who works as a farmer in Gozo.
 Laura SchembriPaul's wife and the mother of Julia, Nadia and Joey.
 Nadia SchembriJulia's sister, Nadia becomes Creasy's girlfriend. Creasy impregnates Nadia and Creasy returns to live with Nadia in Gozo.
 Vico MansuttiThe lawyer for the Balletto family, Vico serves as a go-between in Pinta's kidnapping scheme, between Ettore and the mafia. Creasy wires a plastique to his car, so Vico dies when he starts his car.
 Gina MansuttiVico's wife.
 Mario SattaA member of the Carabinieri tracking Creasy's movements.
 Massimo BelluSatta's assistant.
 ElioElio is Guido's younger brother.
 FeliciaElio's wife.
 PietroAn ex-thief who works as an employee at Guido's pensione.
 CantarellaThe boss of the entire mafia organisation, who is based out of Palermo, Sicily.
 Floriano ContiA mafia boss in Rome and a member of Cantarella's organisation. Creasy uses an anti-tank missile to kill Conti.
 "Wally" WighmanAn Australian who Creasy meets in Rome.
 "Paddy" CollinsAn Australian who Creasy meets in Rome.
 Franco MasiAn owner of a farmhouse next to Villa Colacci, Cantarella's stronghold. Cantarella and the previous occupants served as Masi's benefactor: after Cantarella ordered the destruction of Masi's property, Masi gained a grudge against Cantarella.
 Cesare GravelliOne of Cantarella's main advisors.
 Maurizio DicandiaOne of Cantarella's main advisors.
 Amelia ZanbonSandri's 15-year-old companion.

Development
Two real-life incidents shaped A. J. Quinnell's development of the book. In the first, after the eldest son of a rich Singaporean was kidnapped by Triads for ransom money, the man refused to pay the ransom, leading to the death of his son; the refusal meant that the man's other children would not become targets. The second was the kidnapping of John Paul Getty III, the grandson of Paul Getty, in Rome.

On a previous occasion, Quinnell had helped save the life of an Italian man suffering a medical emergency on an airliner flight between Tokyo and Hong Kong. When he began doing research for the book, he contacted the man's family. The family responded by introducing anti-mafia investigators, lawyers, and mafia members to Quinnell. The contacts eagerly helped Quinnell and asked to be named in the book.

On the island of Gozo, Quinnell often frequented a Maltese bar called "Gleneagles". Several patrons at the bar, many of whom had poor English comprehension, agreed to be characters in the book.

Sequels
Quinnell wrote four more novels featuring Creasy.
 The Perfect Kill (1992)
 The Blue Ring (1993)
 Black Horn (1994)
 Message From Hell (1996)

Reception
After the book's publication in 1981, Man on Fire became a best seller. By 2005 Man on Fire sold over eight million paperback copies and received many translations. Many of the book's most devoted fans come from Japan. The Times of Malta obituary of A. J. Quinnell stated that the Japanese liked Creasy's "samurai-style dedication". Japanese people see Creasy as a "ronin", a disgraced former samurai, who tries to atone for his deeds with charitable acts. Because of the Japanese popularity of the book, Malta received its first significant wave of Japanese tourism. As of 2005, due to the popularity of Quinnell's books, an early edition of Man on Fire had a price tag of £63 (£ when adjusted for inflation).

Films
There were two film adaptations made from this novel, one in 1987 starring Scott Glenn and again in 2004 starring Denzel Washington. 

The 2004 film was remade the following year as the Bollywood film, Ek Ajnabee.

References

1980 British novels
British thriller novels
British novels adapted into films
Novels set in Italy
Novels set in Malta
William Morrow and Company books
1980 debut novels